Colimes is a town located in northern Guayas, Ecuador, on the Daule River. It is the seat of Colimes Canton.

As of the census of 2001, there are 21,049 people residing within canton limits. Its most important crops are: rice, cocoa, and coffee.

Populated places in Guayas Province